Moggill Road is a major road in Brisbane, Queensland, Australia. It commences at High Street at Toowong and terminates at the Moggill Ferry in Moggill. It is part of State Route 33. The road carried an average of 39,305 vehicles per day between July and December 2014.

It passes through the Brisbane suburbs of Toowong, Taringa, Indooroopilly, Chapel Hill, Kenmore, Pullenvale, Pinjarra Hills, Bellbowrie and Moggill.

It stretches . $14 million worth of road works started in 2010, $32 million in 2009, following a further $27 million completed in 2008.

Flooding
During the 2010–2011 Queensland floods, Moggill Road flooded in a number of places, including:
 around the intersections with Market Street and Witton Road, Chapel Hill
 around Pullen Pullen Creek at Pinjarra Hills and Bellowrie

The flooding causes the suburbs of Bellbowrie, Moggill and Karana Downs to be cut off, leading to shortages of food and medical supplies.

Upgrade

Intersection upgrade
A project to upgrade the intersection with Brookfield Road, at a cost of $25 million, was in the planning stage in May 2022.

Major intersections
The entire road is in the Brisbane local government area.

Gallery

See also

 Coronation Drive, Brisbane
 Kenmore Bypass
 Legacy Way
 Milton Road
 Road transport in Brisbane

References

Roads in Brisbane
Toowong
Taringa, Queensland
Indooroopilly, Queensland
Kenmore, Queensland